Bonningues-lès-Ardres (literally Bonningues near Ardres) is a commune in the Pas-de-Calais department in the Hauts-de-France region in northern France.

Geography
A village situated 10 miles (16 km) northwest of Saint-Omer, on theD217 road.

Population

Sights
 The church of St. Leger, dating from the sixteenth century.

See also
Communes of the Pas-de-Calais department

References

Communes of Pas-de-Calais